Journalism is a peer-reviewed academic journal that publishes papers twelve times a year in the field of journalism. The journal's editors are Howard Tumber  (City, University of London) and Barbie Zelizer (University of Pennsylvania). It has been in publication since 2000 and is currently published by SAGE Publications. Journalism is also affiliated to the Journalism Studies Interest Group of the International Communication Association.

Scope 
Journalism publishes theoretical and empirical articles which contribute to the social, political and practical understanding of journalism. The interdisciplinary journal provides a forum for articles, research and findings from academic researchers and critical practitioners with an interest in journalism.

Abstracting and indexing 
Journalism is abstracted and indexed in the following databases:

 Academic Index
 ComIndex
 MLA International Bibliography
 SCOPUS
 Social Sciences Citation Index (Impact factor pending)

External links 
 

SAGE Publishing academic journals
English-language journals
Journalism journals
Monthly journals